Alaska Measure 2 was a ballot initiative approved by voters in Alaska as part of the 2020 United States elections. The proposal switched Alaska's primary system to a non-partisan blanket primary. The top four candidates progress to the general election, which is conducted with ranked-choice voting. Voting for U.S. president will continue to utilize primaries based on political party, but ranked-choice voting will still be used in the general election. The initiative also requires additional disclosures of campaign financing.

Background 
The campaign for Alaska Measure 2 followed on political activist groups seeking to change the electoral rules in Alaska. Throughout the campaign a high volume of campaign funding came from sources outside Alaska. At the end of the campaign, the overwhelming majority of the money spent in the race was spent by groups in favor of the measure. In 2020 a high percentage of Alaskans identified as political independents.

Contents
The proposal appeared on the ballot as follows:

Results

The proposal was narrowly approved, with 50.55% of the vote.

References

measure 2
Alaska Measure 2
Alaska ballot measures
Electoral reform referendums
Electoral system ballot measures in the United States